Bosnia and Herzegovina participated in the Eurovision Song Contest 1995 in Dublin, Ireland. Davorin Popović represented Bosnia and Herzegovina with the song "Dvadeset prvi vijek". They finished on 19th place out of 23 countries with 14 points.

Before Eurovision

BH Eurosong 1995 
The final was held on 8 March 1995 at the Bosnian TV Studios in Sarajevo, hosted by Ismeta Krvavac. Davorin Popović sang all the songs and the winner was chosen by an "expert" jury. Initially there was a tie between "Dvadeset i prvi vijek" and "Bez tebe" so the "expert" jury had to vote again between these two songs. Eventually, "Dvadeset i prvi vijek" was declared the winner.

At Eurovision

Davorin Popović performed 4th on the night of the contest, following Germany and preceding eventual winners Norway. At the close of voting Bosnia and Herzegovina received 14 points, placing 19th of the 23 competing countries. The Bosnian jury awarded its 12 points to Malta.

Voting

References

1995
Countries in the Eurovision Song Contest 1995
Eurovision